The discography of Spock's Beard, an American progressive rock band, consists of thirteen studio albums, one compilation, eight live albums, two singles, and six videos.

Studio albums

Compilations
 From the Vault (1998)
 The First Twenty Years (2015)

Live albums
 Official Live Bootleg/The Beard is Out There (1996)
 Live at the Whisky and NEARfest (1999)
 Don't Try This at Home (2000)
 Nick 'n Neal live in Europe – Two Separate Gorillas (2000)
 There and Here (2000)
 Gluttons for Punishment (2005)
 Live (2008)
 Live at High Voltage Festival (2011)
 The X Tour Live (2012)
 Live at Sea (2014)
 Snow Live (2017)

Singles
 Skin (1999)
 All On a Sunday (2001)

Other
 Live at Sweetwater Studios (2018) - in the studio

Videos
 Spock's Beard Home Movie (Video, 1998)
 Live at the Whisky (Video, (1999)
 The Making of V (Video, May 2001)
 Don't Try This at Home (2 DVD Set, November, 2002)
 The Making of Snow (DVD, 2004)
 Live (DVD, 2008)
 Live at Sea (DVD, 2014)

References

Rock music group discographies
Discographies of American artists